Achalcinae is a subfamily of flies in the family Dolichopodidae. It is an ancestral group close to Medeterinae and Sciapodinae.

Genera
Achalcus Loew, 1857
Apterachalcus Bickel, 1992
Australachalcus Pollet, 2005
Scepastopyga Grootaert & Meuffels, 1997
Xanthina Aldrich, 1902

References

External links 
 

 
Dolichopodidae subfamilies